Cidaris nuda is a species of sea urchins of the Family Cidaridae. Their armour is covered with spines. Cidaris nuda was first scientifically described in 1903 by Ole Mortensen.

See also 
Cidaris blakei
Cidaris mabahissae
Cidaris rugosa

References 

Animals described in 1903
Cidaridae
Taxa named by Ole Theodor Jensen Mortensen